Shoot the Moon: The Essential Collection is a greatest hits album by the punk band Face to Face. It was released on November 15, 2005, a year after the band had dissolved. It features songs from all of the band's albums except for Ignorance Is Bliss and their cover album Standards & Practices.

Track listing

References

Face to Face (punk band) albums
2005 greatest hits albums